Lauroyl chloride is the organic compound with the formula CH3(CH2)10COCl.  It is the acid chloride of lauric acid.  Lauroyl chloride is a standard reagent for installing the lauroyl group.  It is mainly produced as a precursor to dilauroyl peroxide, which is widely used in free-radical polymerizations.

Lauroyl chloride is a substrate for diverse reactions characteristic of acid chlorides.  With base, it converts to laurone, a ketone with the formula [CH3(CH2)10]2CO.  With sodium azide, it reacts to give undecyl isocyanate via a Curtius rearrangement of the acyl azide.

References

Acyl chlorides
Fatty acids
Laurates